Tony Michael O'Connor (15 March 196123 May 2010) was an Australian composer, producer and performer of instrumental, new-age music. His music has sold over three and a half million copies worldwide, releasing his debut album in 1987 and his last in 2007. 

O'Connor also composed music scores for film and television and is one of Australia's biggest selling instrumental musicians. His music sometimes utilises sounds from nature, and is very much focused on relaxation and what he called music therapy. His album, Mariner (1990), reached No. 40 on the ARIA Albums Chart in March 1993. Tony O'Connor died on 23 May 2010, due to a glioblastoma multiforme. He is survived by his life partner, Jacqui O'Connor and their child, Samantha Jane.

Biography 
Tony O'Connor was born in 1961. BT Fasmer of New Age Music Guide observed, "Nature was very important to Tony. He used nature sounds quite heavily in his music, which added both life and context. He even stopped songs in the middle to feature nature sounds. For him birds singing or sounds of waves had a special musical quality... His music will be of special interest for fans of Medwyn Goodall and Clifford White, which both debuted in the late 1980s." In the mid-1980s O'Connor moved to the Sunshine Coast hinterland with his then-girlfriend Jacqui O'Rourke

O'Connor's first album, Journey was released in 1987, classified as "Creative Relaxation Music". O'Connor had previously worked with psychologists and masseurs to create music that was specifically produced to calm and relax the listener. As a result of the album's medicinal qualities, to relieve stress, depression, sleeplessness, and muscle tension, as well as to slow the heart and breathe rate of listeners and lower blood pressure, Journey became sought after by professional therapists and natural healthcare specialists.

As demand for O'Connor's album grew, he and O'Rourke, established a recording studio and record label, Studio Horizons in 1988. This enabled his recordings to be sold to a wider audience, which resulted a jump in sales. In 1989 O'Connor released, Mariner, which reached No. 40 on the ARIA Albums Chart in March 1993. 

From 1992 to 1997, O'Connor collaborated with Australian wildlife photographer and publisher, Steve Parish. They combined to create a range of CDs set to particular nature themes, resulting in albums, Uluru, Kakadu, Rainforest Magic, Wilderness and Windjana – Spirit of the Kimberly. 

Tony O'Connor was diagnosed with glioblastoma multiforme late in 2008, he underwent surgeries but died on 23 May 2010 of the brain tumour. He is survived by his life partner, Jacqui O'Rourke (a.k.a. Jacqui O'Connor), and their child.

In July 2021, Brisbane-based independent music enterprise SGC Group, signed a partnership to release O'Connor's music digitally.

In April 2022 O'Connor's final album, Looking Through My Window was released. It was recorded in the year leading up to his passing.

Composing and recording 

An independent artist, O'Connor recorded all of his music in his own recording studio. Situated on a 42-acre rainforest property, "Hidden Forest" (also the name of an album and a song) on the Blackall Range in Queensland, he described it, "a most inspiring place to live and work", as the studio itself was positioned above the trees, where "...birdsongs fill the daytime... in winter a magical mist floods through the forest and surrounds the house. At night, the sounds are amazing... owls echo across the gorge, crickets and frogs lull us to sleep every evening." O'Connor also recorded as he wrote, with most of his pieces beginning on the guitar or the piano and advancing from there. O'Connor wrote, or began writing, most of his pieces in the early morning, saying "...in the wee hours of the morning... I begin to hear/feel a melody and I simply cannot stop myself from sitting at the piano or picking up a guitar and trying to capture it... before it leaves."

O'Connor considered himself a guitarist more than anything else, claiming that many of his songs would begin on a guitar, even if there was no guitar in the final recording. He played a range of different guitars including 6-string steel string guitars, classical guitars and 12-string guitars. O'Connor mainly played Taylor Guitars, although he claimed that his favourite guitar was a hand-made Mirabook, built for him by Gary Albrecht, admitting, however, that he favoured a 'very special' Takamine Guitars Santa Fe classical. O'Connor's secondary instrument was the piano, in particular, a Yamaha C4 baby grand piano. O'Connor claims that this is where most of his composing came from.

As well as the guitar and the piano, O'Connor also played the flute, both metal and wood based flutes, as well as an Electric Wind Instrument (EWI) which allowed for a wide variety of instrument sounds to be produced on one instrument. He also played percussion, the bass guitar and keyboards. O'Connor usually worked as a solo artist, playing all instruments in his recordings. He did, however, collaborate with guitarist, Paul Clement, on the album, Summer Rain, with songs co-written by both artists featured on the CD. Clement also played the guitar on Mariner, Tales of the Wind, Bushland Dreaming, Lovesong, Live in Concert, Dreams and Discoveries and Whispering Sea.

To record his music, O'Connor used AKG Acoustics and RODE Microphones mics on a Sony digital console. The microphones were first fed through two Amek Channel-In-A-Box units for equalizing and compression. All Taylor guitars were recorded directly using Fishman pickups. As O'Connor was passionate about achieving the best quality recording possible, the equipment he used changed as technology improved and, as a result, the exact equipment used to record each album is not known. Wind Seeker, however, was tracked, mixed and mastered within Emagic's Logic Audio software, using Digidesign digital interfaces on a Macintosh G4 466Mhz computer. The album was recorded in 24bit 44.1 kHz digital audio, however the final master was dithered to 16bit using Waves software plug ins.

Discography

Studio albums

Live albums

Compilation albums

References

External links

2010 deaths
Australian male composers
Australian composers
1961 births
20th-century Australian musicians
20th-century Australian male musicians